Kraison Chansuwanit (born 14 September 1955) is a former Thai naval officer. He served as commander-in-chief of the Royal Thai Navy from 1 October 2014 to 30 September 2015. Na Arreenich was appointed as his successor.

References 

Living people
1955 births
Place of birth missing (living people)
Kraison Chansuwanit
Kraison Chansuwanit